Statistics of the  Cambodian League for the 1988 season.

Overview
Kampong Cham Province won the championship.

References
RSSSF

C-League seasons
Cambodia
Cambodia
football